The Akron Americans was a minor league professional ice hockey team from Akron, Ohio, that played in the International Hockey League's south division during the 1948–49 season. The Americans were the first fully professional ice hockey team from Akron. The team replaced the semi-professional Akron Stars who played in the Ohio State Hockey League from 1946 to 1948.

Results

External links
 team statistics

International Hockey League (1945–2001) teams
Sports in Akron, Ohio
Defunct ice hockey teams in the United States
Ice hockey clubs established in 1948
Ice hockey clubs disestablished in 1949
1948 establishments in Ohio
1949 disestablishments in Ohio
Defunct sports teams in Ohio